Sivananda Rajaram was an Indian social worker and the General Secretary of Sivananda Saraswathi Sevasaram, a non governmental organization working for the cause of orphans. He took over the reins of Sivananda Saraswathi Sevasaram at the age of 19 from his parents who founded the organization. His efforts under the aegis of the organization is reported to be reaching 25 villages in the south Indian state of Tamil Nadu. He was honored by the Government of India, in 2002, with the fourth highest Indian civilian award of Padma Shri.

References

20th-century births
2020 deaths
Recipients of the Padma Shri in social work
Social workers
Scholars from Chennai
Social workers from Tamil Nadu
Year of birth missing